Old Time Relijun is a band founded in Olympia, Washington, United States and a longtime member of K Records. Current members consist of Germaine Baca on drums, Aaron Hartman on upright bass, Ben Hartman on saxophones, and Arrington de Dionyso on electric guitar, vocals and bass clarinet. The reviews of the band are radically mixed among critics. Pitchfork Media gave a very critical review of their Uterus and fire album, while another praised the band for their "brilliance". The band first began recording under a home-made audio cassette label, Pine Cone Alley, and were later adopted by indie label K Records. Old Time Relijun are currently based in Portland, Oregon.

Discography
1997
Songbook Vol. I (Pine Cone Alley) CD - out of print
"Casino" on Overboard compilation (YOYO)
"Siren" on Selector Dub Narcotic compilation (K)
 (the above were recorded with Bryce Panic on drums)
1998
"Qiyamat" on KAOS Theory compilation (Cottleston Pie/Mayonnaise)
"Jail" b/w "Office Building" 7"
1999
Uterus and Fire CD/LP (K)
"Giant Boat" video on the Blackeye Video compilation
2000
La Sirena de Pecera CD/LP (K)
"Sabertooth Tyger-Distorted Version" on the Hootnholler compilation
2001
Witchcraft Rebellion CD/LP (K)
"King of Nothing" b/w "drum n bass" 7" (tour-only by Wallace Records)
2003
Varieties of Religious Experience CD (K)
Neon Meate Dream of an Octafish: A Tribute to Captain Beefheart & His Magic Band (track "Wild Life")
2004
Lost Light CD/LP (K)
2005
2012 CD (K)
2007
Catharsis in Crisis CD/LP
2019
See Now and Know CD/LP (K)
2021
Musicking CD/LP/Digital Download (K)

References

Indie rock musical groups from Washington (state)
American experimental musical groups
Musical groups from Portland, Oregon
Musical groups from Olympia, Washington
Dance-punk musical groups
Musical groups established in 1995
1995 establishments in Washington (state)